Francesca Segat (born 21 January 1983 in Vittorio Veneto, Province of Treviso) is a butterfly swimmer from Italy who won the silver medal in the 200 m butterfly at the European Short Course Swimming Championships 2003.

Francesca Segat also won the silver medal at the World SC Championship in Shanghai in 2006 in the 200 m butterfly with a time of 2:05.91, and she won the silver medal at the European Championship 2006 in Budapest in the same event with a time of 2:08.96.

She resides in Rome and is trained by Andrea Palloni and Claudio Rossetto.

References

1983 births
Living people
People from Vittorio Veneto
Italian female swimmers
Italian female medley swimmers
Female butterfly swimmers
Olympic swimmers of Italy
Swimmers at the 2004 Summer Olympics
Swimmers of Fiamme Gialle
Medalists at the FINA World Swimming Championships (25 m)
European Aquatics Championships medalists in swimming
Mediterranean Games bronze medalists for Italy
Swimmers at the 2005 Mediterranean Games
Mediterranean Games medalists in swimming
Sportspeople from the Province of Treviso
21st-century Italian women